Adam Berg may refer to:

Adam Berg (director) (born 1972), Swedish music video director 
Adam Berg (publisher) (1540–1610), German publisher
Adam Berg (historian) from Kazania sejmowe
Adam Berg (actor), American actor best known for his role in BYUtv’s Studio C